whocanisue.com was a legal website operated by WCIS Media, LLC, that offered information to internet users that may believe they have a legal claim against another person or business. The company's mission was to provide legal information to internet users, assist users in determining if they have a lawsuit, and suggest users attorneys within their area.

whocanisue.com was branded into a  Spanish website called Meto Un Su . The website was featured in the news.

WCIS Media, LLC, was administratively dissolved by the State of Florida in 2016.

References

External links
whocanisue.com Homepage
whocanisue Blog
Meto Un Su

Legal websites